Harald Espelund (born 10 December 1948) is a Norwegian politician for the Progress Party.

He served as a deputy representative to the Norwegian Parliament from Akershus during the term 2001–2005.

On the local level he was the mayor of Ullensaker from 2003 to 2015. Outside politics he is an organic farmer.

References

1948 births
Living people
Deputy members of the Storting
Progress Party (Norway) politicians
Mayors of places in Akershus
People from Ullensaker
Place of birth missing (living people)